Burksville is an unincorporated community in the historic New Design Precinct of Monroe County, Illinois, United States. Originally developed by John P. Brown, Burksville was named in 1857 after John G. Burkhardt, a resident of St. Louis, who opened a store there in 1851. It lies along the old Kaskaskia to St. Louis road off Illinois Route 3, south of Waterloo.

References 

Unincorporated communities in Monroe County, Illinois
Unincorporated communities in Illinois
Metro East
Populated places established in 1857
1857 establishments in Illinois